More for Les at the Village Vanguard is live album by saxophonist Art Pepper, recorded at the Village Vanguard in 1977 and released on the Contemporary label as the Volume Four of Pepper's Vanguard recordings.

Reception

The AllMusic review by Scott Yanow states: "The great altoist was clearly excited to be playing at the famous New York club, and his rhythm section -- pianist George Cables, bassist George Mraz and drummer Elvin Jones -- consistently stimulates his imagination".

Track listing
All compositions by Art Pepper except as indicated
 Introduction - 0:52 	
 "No Limit" - 12:46
 "These Foolish Things" (Jack Strachey, Harry Link, Holt Marvell) - 	8:03
 Introduction - 0:33
 "More for Les" - 15:17 	
 "Over the Rainbow" (Harold Arlen, Yip Harburg) - 6:37 	
 "Scrapple from the Apple" (Charlie Parker) - 11:21 Bonus track on CD reissue

Personnel
Art Pepper - alto saxophone, (tenor saxophone on These Foolish Things), (clarinet on More For Les)
George Cables - piano
George Mraz - bass
Elvin Jones - drums

References

Contemporary Records live albums
Art Pepper live albums
1985 live albums
Albums recorded at the Village Vanguard